Canyelles is a neighbourhood in the Nou Barris district of the city of Barcelona, Catalonia, Spain.

Canyelles metro station, on line L3 of the Barcelona Metro, lies on the southern boundary of the neighbourhood.

References

Neighbourhoods of Barcelona
Nou Barris